Bogobe jwa logala is sorghum porridge cooked in boiling milk. It is a breakfast dish. One can add sugar or not. However, if still hot sugar can make it runny.

African cuisine
Porridges